The Space Between is a 2016 Australian-Italian drama film directed by Ruth Borgobello. It was selected as the Australian entry for the Best Foreign Language Film at the 90th Academy Awards, but it was not nominated.

Plot
Marco, a 35-year-old chef, returns to his home in Italy to care for his ailing father. He meets Olivia, an aspiring Australian designer.

Cast
 Flavio Parenti as Marco
 Maeve Dermody as Olivia
 Lino Guanciale as Claudio

See also
 List of submissions to the 90th Academy Awards for Best Foreign Language Film
 List of Australian submissions for the Academy Award for Best Foreign Language Film

References

External links
 

2016 films
2016 drama films
Australian drama films
Italian drama films
2010s Italian-language films
2010s Australian films